Joseph Louis Rotman,  (January 6, 1935 – January 27, 2015), was a noted Canadian businessman and philanthropist. Rotman was the founder, benefactor and member of many successful organizations, such as the Clairvest Group Inc., the Rotman Research Institute, the Rotman School of Management, and the Rotman Institute of Philosophy. Throughout his life, he received three honorary degrees, as well as an induction into the Canadian Business Hall of Fame. He is well-regarded for donating his time and financial assistance to numerous philanthropic causes including the arts, education and healthcare.

Early life and family
Joseph Rotman was born in Toronto, Ontario, Canada in 1935. He attended the University of Western Ontario  after which he continued on to the University of Toronto to obtain his M.Comm. from the Institute of Business Administration in 1960.

He was married to Sandra Frieberg since 1959 until his death; they had two children: Janis and Kenneth.

Business career
Rotman began his business career in 1962 and had been involved in establishing a number of private and public companies active in oil trading, petroleum distribution, oil and gas exploration, merchant banking, real estate, and venture capital. In 1987, he founded Clairvest Group Inc., a Canadian-based company, which provides merchant banking for emerging companies and is listed on the Toronto Stock Exchange.

Joseph was also the Chairman of Roy-L Capital Corporation, a private family investment company. He served on numerous corporate boards including the Bank of Montreal, Barrick Gold Corporation, Canada Northwest Energy Ltd. (subsequently acquired by Sherritt International), Masonite International, and TrizecHahn Corporation. He was involved as a founder of Tarragon Oil and Gas, Geocrude Energy, PanCana Resources, PanCana Minerals and Embassy Resources, as well as a number of other companies.

Philanthropy
As both patrons and benefactors, Joseph and his wife Sandra demonstrated a long-term commitment to promoting and developing internationally renowned Canadian institutions in the arts, education and healthcare. As well, they supported the creation of new knowledge in science and technology, business practices, and public policy.

Over the past 20 years, Joseph and Sandra Rotman served on numerous boards and donated more than $90 million. They shared a passion and support for higher education, the arts and healthcare. Joseph once noted, "My father taught me that the most powerful way to inspire others to give is for them to see people giving in their community."

On April 6, 2016, it was announced that the estate of Joseph Rotman is making a landmark $30 million gift to the University of Toronto's Rotman School of Management. The gift will help the Rotman School, already one of the leading global brands in management education, continue to be at the forefront of transforming management education and research.

Supporter of the arts
A lifelong enthusiast and supporter of the arts, Rotman applied his business experience to creating environments for the arts to thrive in Canada and throughout the world. Rotman served as chair of the Board of the Art Gallery of Ontario (1993–96), as a Board Member (1991-2000) and continued, along with his wife, to be a benefactor. During this time, he was also a Member of the Board of the Governor General's Performing Arts Awards (1996-1998).

In July 2008, Rotman was appointed to a five-year term as Chair of the Canada Council for the Arts, the national arts funding agency that provides grants, endowments, prizes and promotion of the arts. He was re-elected as chair in July 2013 for an additional 5 years.

Education benefactor
The Rotmans established involvement with the University of Toronto since 1981. From 2001 to 2004, Rotman sat on the Committee for Honorary Degrees, was a Governing Council Member from 1995 to 2003, an Executive Committee Member (1998-2003) and was the vice-chair of the University of Toronto's Asset Management Corporation (2000-2006).

The Rotman School of Management was named in his honour by the leading gift of his wife and family and is an internationally renowned business education institution that educates globally competitive leaders and maintains the world's leading business faculty. The Rotmans also provided financial assistance for the Lloyd and Delphine Martin Prosperity Institute.

The Rotmans also supported the Western University since 1999 through the Rotman Institute of Philosophy – Engaging Science, which fosters a global centre to build novel and productive bridges between humanities and the sciences to address relevant issues faced by society. In addition, Rotman established the Rotman Canada Research Chair in Philosophy of Science addressing the nature of scientific theory.

Advancement of life sciences and innovation
Rotman lent his business experience to the advancement of Canadian life sciences research, Canadian innovation and commercialization capacity, and related public policy at both the federal and provincial levels, including the Canadian Institutes of Health Research (CIHR), and Chair of the Ontario Genomics Institute, a provincial entity, for Genome Canada.

In 1989, the Rotman Research Institute was established to gain knowledge in cognitive neuroscience. Since 1990, his wife's financial contributions have assisted the University Health Network at the University of Toronto in founding the Sandra Rotman Centre for Global Health along with the Sandra Rotman Chair in Health Sector Strategy.

He was also a founder and was a member of the Board of Directors of MaRS (Medical and Related Sciences) Discovery District.

Rotman began co-leading the development of a major review and study of the state of brain research in Ontario and Canada in 2008. The review covered recommendations to transform brain research as well as its translation and commercialization in Ontario. This included the creation of the Ontario Brain Institute with a focus on optimizing the health, economic and societal impacts from brain research in Ontario and Canada. As a result, he served as the chair of the board of directors with the institute, a virtual research centre helping Ontario to build on its global neuroscience achievements by turning health care discoveries into products and services to help people affected by brain diseases and disorders.

Another significant appointment for Rotman was Chairman of Grand Challenges Canada, a not-for-profit organization dedicated to improving the health and well-being of people in developing countries by integrating scientific, technological, business and social innovation both in Canada and in the developing world.  Grand Challenges Canada was originally funded by the federal government's Development Innovation Fund announced in the 2008 budget, working in a consortium with the International Development Research Centre, and the Canadian Institutes of Health Research.

He chaired both the Ontario BioCouncil Report for the Ontario government and the Expert Panel on Commercialization, called People and Excellence, a report for Industry Canada on commercialization.

Other boards and committees that Rotman has served on include: Gairdner Foundation International, Global Network of Science Academies and Royal Societies Development Advisory Committee, Ontario Genomics Institute, StemCell Network,  and the Baycrest Centre for Geriatric Care.

Awards and honours
In 1994, Rotman was awarded an honorary LLD from the University of Toronto. Less than a year later, his appointment as an Officer of the Order of Canada was announced, and he was invested on March 1, 1995.

In 2009, Rotman was awarded his second honorary LLD, from Western University, and he was also inducted into the Canadian Business Hall of Fame as a Companion and honoured, along with his wife Sandra, with the Outstanding Philanthropists Award by The Association of Fundraising Professionals.

On November 21, 2011, Rotman was named the twenty-first Chancellor of his alma mater, Western University. His four-year term began on July 1, 2012.

On February 29, 2012, Rotman was presented with the Lifetime Achievement Award from Life Sciences Ontario. On October 10, 2012, Rotman was presented with the Entrepreneur of the Year 2012 Ontario Lifetime Achievement Award from Ernst & Young.

In 2013, Rotman was awarded an honorary LLD from Memorial University.

At a ceremony at Rideau Hall on November 18, 2015, the Governor General posthumously awarded the Meritorious Service Cross to Rotman, and the decoration was presented to his widow, Sandra.

Other achievements

Rotman and his wife were also awarded the Beth Sholom Brotherhood Humanitarian award in 2010. Rotman was the Honouree of The Toronto Club's 2011 Annual Members Dinner. He was active with many other local, national and international organizations.

Death
Rotman died on January 27, 2015, at Toronto General Hospital, and he was interred at Mount Pleasant Cemetery, Toronto.

References

External links
Sandra Rotman Centre 
Ontario Brain Institute
Grand Challenges Canada
MaRS Discovery District
Order of Canada
Clairvest Group Inc.
Rotman School of Management
Canadian Business Hall of Fame
Rotman Research Institute
Western University
University of Toronto
Toronto Stock Exchange
Bank of Montreal
Barrick Gold Corporation
Art Gallery of Ontario 
Governor General's Performing Arts Award
Canada Council for the Arts
Martin Prosperity Institute
Rotman Institute of Philosophy
Rotman Canada Research Chair in Philosophy of Science
Canadian Institutes of Health Research
Ontario Genomics Institute
Genome Canada
University Health Network
McLaughlin-Rotman Centre for Global Health 
Ontario Health Study
Industry Canada
Gairdner Foundation International
Global Network of Science Academies
Baycrest Centre for Geriatric Care
Association of Fundraising Professionals
Beth Sholom Brotherhood Humanitarian Award

1935 births
2015 deaths
Businesspeople from Toronto
Officers of the Order of Canada
University of Western Ontario alumni
University of Toronto alumni
Jewish Canadian philanthropists
Recipients of the Meritorious Service Decoration
Chancellors of the University of Western Ontario
20th-century philanthropists